An ode (from ) is a type of lyric poetry. Odes are elaborately structured poems praising or glorifying an event or individual, describing nature intellectually as well as emotionally. A classic ode is structured in three major parts: the strophe, the antistrophe, and the epode. Different forms such as the homostrophic ode and the irregular ode also enter.

Greek odes were originally poetic pieces performed with musical accompaniment. As time passed on, they gradually became known as personal lyrical compositions whether sung (with or without musical instruments) or merely recited (always with accompaniment). The primary instruments used were the aulos and the lyre (the latter was the most revered instrument to the ancient Greeks).

There are three typical forms of odes: the Pindaric, Horatian, and irregular. Pindaric odes follow the form and style of Pindar. Horatian odes follow conventions of Horace; the odes of Horace deliberately imitated the Greek lyricists such as Alcaeus and Anacreon. Irregular odes use rhyme, but not the three-part form of the Pindaric ode, nor the two- or four-line stanza of the Horatian ode. The ode is a lyric poem. It conveys exalted and inspired emotions. It is a lyric in an elaborate form, expressed in a language that is imaginative, dignified and sincere. Like the lyric, an ode is of Greek origin.

English ode

The lyrics can be on various themes. The earliest odes in the English language, using the word in its strict form, were the Epithalamium and Prothalamium of Edmund Spenser.

In the 17th century, the original odes in English were by Abraham Cowley. These were iambic, but had irregular line length patterns and rhyme schemes. Cowley based the principle of his Pindariques on an apparent misunderstanding of Pindar's metrical practice but, nonetheless, others widely imitated his style, with notable success by John Dryden.

With Pindar's metre being better understood in the 18th century, the fashion for Pindaric odes faded, though there are notable actual Pindaric odes by Thomas Gray, The Progress of Poesy and The Bard.

There was a time when meadow, grove, and stream,
The earth, and every common sight,
To me did seem
Apparelled in celestial light,
The glory and the freshness of a dream.
It is not now as it hath been of yore;—
Turn wheresoe'er I may,
By night or day,
The things which I have seen I now can see no more....
Our birth is but a sleep and a forgetting:
The Soul that rises with us, our life's Star,
Hath had elsewhere its setting,
And cometh from afar:
Not in entire forgetfulness,
And not in utter nakedness,
But trailing clouds of glory do we come
From God, who is our home...
(Excerpt from Wordsworth's Intimations of Immortality)

Around 1800, William Wordsworth revived Cowley's  Pindarick for one of his finest poems, the Intimations of Immortality ode. Others also wrote odes: Samuel Taylor Coleridge, John Keats, and Percy Bysshe Shelley who wrote odes with regular stanza patterns. Shelley's Ode to the West Wind, written in fourteen line terza rima stanzas, is a major poem in the form. Perhaps the greatest odes of the 19th century, however, were Keats's Five Great Odes of 1819, which included "Ode to a Nightingale", "Ode on Melancholy", "Ode on a Grecian Urn", "Ode to Psyche", and "To Autumn". After Keats, there have been comparatively few major odes in English. One major exception is the fourth verse of the poem For the Fallen by Laurence Binyon, which is often known as The Ode to the Fallen, or simply as The Ode.

W.H. Auden also wrote Ode, one of the most popular poems from his earlier career when he lived in London, in opposition to people's ignorance over the reality of war. In an interview, Auden once stated that he had intended to title the poem My Silver Age in mockery of England's supposed imperial golden age, however chose Ode as it seemed to provide a more sensitive exploration of warfare.

Ode on a Grecian Urn, while an ekphrasis, also functions as an ode to the artistic beauty the narrator observes. The English ode's most common rhyme scheme is ABABCDECDE.
Centuries were occasionally set to music. Composers such as Purcell, Händel and Boyce all set English odes to music.

Notable practitioners

Horace
Sharon Olds
Thomas Gray
John Keats
Samuel Taylor Coleridge
William Wordsworth
Percy Bysshe Shelley
Pablo Neruda
Álvaro de Campos
Thomas Nashe
John Donne
Allen Tate
Gary Soto
Ronsard
Federico García Lorca

See also
Epinikion

References

External links

Ancient Greek theatre
Poetic forms